North Linkor Road is a major road of the city of Lhasa in the Tibet Autonomous Region of China which links the city to the north of Tibet.

Roads in Tibet
Transport in Lhasa